The Barbados National Oil Company Ltd. (BNOCL) is a national state-owned energy provider in the country of Barbados.  Founded several decades ago, the company satisfies about 30% of the country's total consumption of oil and gas.

With approximately 90 000 homes across the island of Barbados, the company lays claims to having natural gas hookups with 70 000 of them.  In addition, to the many homes connect to the islands' natural gas infrastructure the company also supplies he Barbados Light and Power Company, the airport, and provides gas distribution for many of the islands' privately owned gas stations.

Subsidies:
The Barbados National Terminal Company Limited (BNTCL)

External links

The Barbados National Terminal Co. Ltd - (Official website)

Oil and gas companies of Barbados
National oil and gas companies